Sport Club Popești-Leordeni, commonly known as SC Popești-Leordeni, or simply as Popești-Leordeni, is a Romanian  football club based in Popești-Leordeni, Ilfov County. Founded in 2011 as CS Popești-Leordeni the club situated near Bucharest merged in 2013 with the newly promoted club in the Liga III Gloria Cornești, being enrolled directly in the third tier, under the name of Gloria Popești-Leordeni.

History
Sport Club Popești-Leordeni was founded in 2011 under the name of CS Popești-Leordeni, in order to continue the football tradition in town after the dissolution of more known Inter Gaz București and of Viscofil Popești-Leordeni. After a first year in which the team succeeded to promote from Liga V to Liga IV, followed two years in a row in the fourth tier, but the white and reds missed the Liga III promotion play-off. Eventually, the club found another solution and in 2013 merged with newly promoted club Gloria Cornești, which was absorbed by CS, the new entity being named Gloria Popești-Leordeni.

In 2016 Gloria Popești-Leordeni was renamed as SC Popești-Leordeni.

Grounds
In the first year of existence, SC Popești-Leordeni played its home matches on Viscofil Stadium, in Popești-Leordeni, with a capacity of 3,000 people, then moving on Inter Gaz Stadium, after its renovation. Inter Gaz Stadium has a capacity of 1,000 seats and was the home ground of defunct Inter Gaz București.

Chronology of names

Honours
Liga III
Runners-up (1): 2021–22
Liga IV – Ilfov County
Runners-up (1): 2012–13
Liga V – Ilfov County
Winners (1): 2011–12
Cupa României – Ilfov County
Winners (1): 2012–13

Players

First-team squad

Out on loan

Club officials

Board of directors

Current technical staff

League history

Notable former managers

  Viorel Dinu
  Adrian Iencsi

References

External links
SC Popești-Leordeni at soccerway.com

Association football clubs established in 2011
Football clubs in Ilfov County
Liga III clubs
Liga IV clubs
2011 establishments in Romania